The 1955 VFL season was the 59th season of the Victorian Football League (VFL), the highest level senior Australian rules football competition in Victoria. The season featured twelve clubs, ran from 16 April until 17 September, and comprised an 18-game home-and-away season followed by a finals series featuring the top four clubs.

The premiership was won by the Melbourne Football Club for the seventh time, after it defeated  by 28 points in the 1955 VFL Grand Final.

Premiership season
In 1955, the VFL competition consisted of twelve teams of 18 on-the-field players each, plus two substitute players, known as the 19th man and the 20th man. A player could be substituted for any reason; however, once substituted, a player could not return to the field of play under any circumstances.

Teams played each other in a home-and-away season of 18 rounds; matches 12 to 18 were the "home-and-away reverse" of matches 1 to 7.

Once the 18 round home-and-away season had finished, the 1955 VFL Premiers were determined by the specific format and conventions of the Page–McIntyre system.

Round 1

|- bgcolor="#CCCCFF"
| Home team
| Home team score
| Away team
| Away team score
| Venue
| Crowd
| Date
|- bgcolor="#FFFFFF"
| 
| 15.14 (104)
| 
| 9.12 (66)
| Kardinia Park
| 20,976
| 16 April 1955
|- bgcolor="#FFFFFF"
| 
| 13.15 (93)
| 
| 7.16 (58)
| Brunswick Street Oval
| 16,000
| 16 April 1955
|- bgcolor="#FFFFFF"
| 
| 6.12 (48)
| 
| 15.14 (104)
| Victoria Park
| 33,398
| 16 April 1955
|- bgcolor="#FFFFFF"
| 
| 19.20 (134)
| 
| 10.5 (65)
| Princes Park
| 25,041
| 16 April 1955
|- bgcolor="#FFFFFF"
| 
| 8.11 (59)
| 
| 17.16 (118)
| Junction Oval
| 20,000
| 16 April 1955
|- bgcolor="#FFFFFF"
| 
| 9.23 (77)
| 
| 13.16 (94)
| Punt Road Oval
| 30,000
| 16 April 1955

Round 2

|- bgcolor="#CCCCFF"
| Home team
| Home team score
| Away team
| Away team score
| Venue
| Crowd
| Date
|- bgcolor="#FFFFFF"
| 
| 16.16 (112)
| 
| 12.9 (81)
| Western Oval
| 33,753
| 23 April 1955
|- bgcolor="#FFFFFF"
| 
| 16.24 (120)
| 
| 8.7 (55)
| Windy Hill
| 18,000
| 23 April 1955
|- bgcolor="#FFFFFF"
| 
| 16.15 (111)
| 
| 8.14 (62)
| MCG
| 32,363
| 23 April 1955
|- bgcolor="#FFFFFF"
| 
| 16.11 (107)
| 
| 9.15 (69)
| Lake Oval
| 18,000
| 23 April 1955
|- bgcolor="#FFFFFF"
| 
| 9.16 (70)
| 
| 21.11 (137)
| Arden Street Oval
| 21,000
| 23 April 1955
|- bgcolor="#FFFFFF"
| 
| 12.15 (87)
| 
| 9.6 (60)
| Glenferrie Oval
| 19,000
| 23 April 1955

Round 3

|- bgcolor="#CCCCFF"
| Home team
| Home team score
| Away team
| Away team score
| Venue
| Crowd
| Date
|- bgcolor="#FFFFFF"
| 
| 15.13 (103)
| 
| 9.11 (65)
| Kardinia Park
| 19,565
| 30 April 1955
|- bgcolor="#FFFFFF"
| 
| 11.14 (80)
| 
| 9.15 (69)
| Windy Hill
| 21,000
| 30 April 1955
|- bgcolor="#FFFFFF"
| 
| 16.20 (116)
| 
| 8.11 (59)
| Victoria Park
| 18,095
| 30 April 1955
|- bgcolor="#FFFFFF"
| 
| 17.4 (106)
| 
| 6.13 (49)
| Princes Park
| 23,435
| 30 April 1955
|- bgcolor="#FFFFFF"
| 
| 7.14 (56)
| 
| 15.8 (98)
| Lake Oval
| 18,000
| 30 April 1955
|- bgcolor="#FFFFFF"
| 
| 6.22 (58)
| 
| 6.10 (46)
| MCG
| 49,280
| 30 April 1955

Round 4

|- bgcolor="#CCCCFF"
| Home team
| Home team score
| Away team
| Away team score
| Venue
| Crowd
| Date
|- bgcolor="#FFFFFF"
| 
| 15.20 (110)
| 
| 7.10 (52)
| Punt Road Oval
| 20,000
| 7 May 1955
|- bgcolor="#FFFFFF"
| 
| 10.13 (73)
| 
| 11.17 (83)
| Brunswick Street Oval
| 16,000
| 7 May 1955
|- bgcolor="#FFFFFF"
| 
| 9.7 (61)
| 
| 10.14 (74)
| Arden Street Oval
| 13,500
| 7 May 1955
|- bgcolor="#FFFFFF"
| 
| 4.12 (36)
| 
| 2.11 (23)
| Western Oval
| 36,615
| 7 May 1955
|- bgcolor="#FFFFFF"
| 
| 12.12 (84)
| 
| 12.3 (75)
| Glenferrie Oval
| 26,000
| 7 May 1955
|- bgcolor="#FFFFFF"
| 
| 7.22 (64)
| 
| 15.9 (99)
| Junction Oval
| 23,000
| 7 May 1955

Round 5

|- bgcolor="#CCCCFF"
| Home team
| Home team score
| Away team
| Away team score
| Venue
| Crowd
| Date
|- bgcolor="#FFFFFF"
| 
| 14.7 (91)
| 
| 13.15 (93)
| Glenferrie Oval
| 15,000
| 14 May 1955
|- bgcolor="#FFFFFF"
| 
| 8.11 (59)
| 
| 10.13 (73)
| Windy Hill
| 25,299
| 14 May 1955
|- bgcolor="#FFFFFF"
| 
| 12.17 (89)
| 
| 17.12 (114)
| Princes Park
| 37,065
| 14 May 1955
|- bgcolor="#FFFFFF"
| 
| 25.16 (166)
| 
| 4.8 (32)
| Lake Oval
| 15,000
| 14 May 1955
|- bgcolor="#FFFFFF"
| 
| 12.12 (84)
| 
| 10.12 (72)
| Kardinia Park
| 28,288
| 14 May 1955
|- bgcolor="#FFFFFF"
| 
| 11.11 (77)
| 
| 15.9 (99)
| Punt Road Oval
| 15,000
| 14 May 1955

Round 6

|- bgcolor="#CCCCFF"
| Home team
| Home team score
| Away team
| Away team score
| Venue
| Crowd
| Date
|- bgcolor="#FFFFFF"
| 
| 10.14 (74)
| 
| 7.10 (52)
| Arden Street Oval
| 13,000
| 21 May 1955
|- bgcolor="#FFFFFF"
| 
| 15.11 (101)
| 
| 6.11 (47)
| Victoria Park
| 35,000
| 21 May 1955
|- bgcolor="#FFFFFF"
| 
| 11.9 (75)
| 
| 12.11 (83)
| Princes Park
| 23,000
| 21 May 1955
|- bgcolor="#FFFFFF"
| 
| 11.5 (71)
| 
| 6.8 (44)
| MCG
| 28,338
| 21 May 1955
|- bgcolor="#FFFFFF"
| 
| 4.5 (29)
| 
| 6.12 (48)
| Junction Oval
| 11,000
| 21 May 1955
|- bgcolor="#FFFFFF"
| 
| 8.10 (58)
| 
| 10.6 (66)
| Western Oval
| 24,517
| 21 May 1955

Round 7

|- bgcolor="#CCCCFF"
| Home team
| Home team score
| Away team
| Away team score
| Venue
| Crowd
| Date
|- bgcolor="#FFFFFF"
| 
| 17.20 (122)
| 
| 7.14 (56)
| Punt Road Oval
| 12,500
| 28 May 1955
|- bgcolor="#FFFFFF"
| 
| 10.9 (69)
| 
| 8.14 (62)
| Western Oval
| 26,086
| 28 May 1955
|- bgcolor="#FFFFFF"
| 
| 9.11 (65)
| 
| 10.10 (70)
| Windy Hill
| 20,000
| 28 May 1955
|- bgcolor="#FFFFFF"
| 
| 10.11 (71)
| 
| 11.6 (72)
| Lake Oval
| 24,000
| 28 May 1955
|- bgcolor="#FFFFFF"
| 
| 6.9 (45)
| 
| 16.13 (109)
| Brunswick Street Oval
| 30,000
| 28 May 1955
|- bgcolor="#FFFFFF"
| 
| 12.12 (84)
| 
| 10.9 (69)
| Kardinia Park
| 21,088
| 28 May 1955

Round 8

|- bgcolor="#CCCCFF"
| Home team
| Home team score
| Away team
| Away team score
| Venue
| Crowd
| Date
|- bgcolor="#FFFFFF"
| 
| 9.8 (62)
| 
| 8.12 (60)
| Glenferrie Oval
| 19,600
| 4 June 1955
|- bgcolor="#FFFFFF"
| 
| 13.14 (92)
| 
| 7.12 (54)
| Windy Hill
| 23,500
| 4 June 1955
|- bgcolor="#FFFFFF"
| 
| 11.11 (77)
| 
| 10.7 (67)
| Victoria Park
| 34,000
| 4 June 1955
|- bgcolor="#FFFFFF"
| 
| 4.10 (34)
| 
| 13.7 (85)
| Junction Oval
| 19,250
| 4 June 1955
|- bgcolor="#FFFFFF"
| 
| 11.5 (71)
| 
| 12.16 (88)
| Arden Street Oval
| 13,000
| 4 June 1955
|- bgcolor="#FFFFFF"
| 
| 20.15 (135)
| 
| 9.16 (70)
| MCG
| 34,670
| 4 June 1955

Round 9

|- bgcolor="#CCCCFF"
| Home team
| Home team score
| Away team
| Away team score
| Venue
| Crowd
| Date
|- bgcolor="#FFFFFF"
| 
| 17.12 (114)
| 
| 8.11 (59)
| Western Oval
| 28,807
| 11 June 1955
|- bgcolor="#FFFFFF"
| 
| 4.4 (28)
| 
| 11.20 (86)
| Princes Park
| 29,555
| 11 June 1955
|- bgcolor="#FFFFFF"
| 
| 8.15 (63)
| 
| 9.18 (72)
| Lake Oval
| 35,000
| 11 June 1955
|- bgcolor="#FFFFFF"
| 
| 13.16 (94)
| 
| 11.12 (78)
| MCG
| 39,949
| 13 June 1955
|- bgcolor="#FFFFFF"
| 
| 19.14 (128)
| 
| 7.12 (54)
| Brunswick Street Oval
| 14,000
| 13 June 1955
|- bgcolor="#FFFFFF"
| 
| 12.9 (81)
| 
| 13.17 (95)
| Arden Street Oval
| 24,000
| 13 June 1955

Round 10

|- bgcolor="#CCCCFF"
| Home team
| Home team score
| Away team
| Away team score
| Venue
| Crowd
| Date
|- bgcolor="#FFFFFF"
| 
| 12.9 (81)
| 
| 6.7 (43)
| Glenferrie Oval
| 10,500
| 25 June 1955
|- bgcolor="#FFFFFF"
| 
| 5.9 (39)
| 
| 10.11 (71)
| Brunswick Street Oval
| 21,000
| 25 June 1955
|- bgcolor="#FFFFFF"
| 
| 6.7 (43)
| 
| 11.15 (81)
| Princes Park
| 20,576
| 25 June 1955
|- bgcolor="#FFFFFF"
| 
| 10.10 (70)
| 
| 8.10 (58)
| Lake Oval
| 16,000
| 25 June 1955
|- bgcolor="#FFFFFF"
| 
| 10.5 (65)
| 
| 7.10 (52)
| Kardinia Park
| 23,654
| 25 June 1955
|- bgcolor="#FFFFFF"
| 
| 6.12 (48)
| 
| 14.14 (98)
| Punt Road Oval
| 29,000
| 25 June 1955

Round 11

|- bgcolor="#CCCCFF"
| Home team
| Home team score
| Away team
| Away team score
| Venue
| Crowd
| Date
|- bgcolor="#FFFFFF"
| 
| 16.13 (109)
| 
| 7.8 (50)
| Kardinia Park
| 17,238
| 2 July 1955
|- bgcolor="#FFFFFF"
| 
| 11.16 (82)
| 
| 6.13 (49)
| Western Oval
| 26,697
| 2 July 1955
|- bgcolor="#FFFFFF"
| 
| 8.20 (68)
| 
| 5.12 (42)
| Windy Hill
| 19,000
| 2 July 1955
|- bgcolor="#FFFFFF"
| 
| 7.6 (48)
| 
| 5.15 (45)
| Victoria Park
| 40,000
| 2 July 1955
|- bgcolor="#FFFFFF"
| 
| 10.8 (68)
| 
| 8.13 (61)
| Junction Oval
| 10,500
| 2 July 1955
|- bgcolor="#FFFFFF"
| 
| 14.12 (96)
| 
| 7.7 (49)
| Punt Road Oval
| 16,000
| 2 July 1955

Round 12

|- bgcolor="#CCCCFF"
| Home team
| Home team score
| Away team
| Away team score
| Venue
| Crowd
| Date
|- bgcolor="#FFFFFF"
| 
| 17.16 (118)
| 
| 3.3 (21)
| MCG
| 15,624
| 9 July 1955
|- bgcolor="#FFFFFF"
| 
| 14.7 (91)
| 
| 5.20 (50)
| Windy Hill
| 19,500
| 9 July 1955
|- bgcolor="#FFFFFF"
| 
| 13.10 (88)
| 
| 15.9 (99)
| Lake Oval
| 17,000
| 9 July 1955
|- bgcolor="#FFFFFF"
| 
| 18.12 (120)
| 
| 9.5 (59)
| Glenferrie Oval
| 10,500
| 9 July 1955
|- bgcolor="#FFFFFF"
| 
| 5.13 (43)
| 
| 5.7 (37)
| Western Oval
| 42,354
| 9 July 1955
|- bgcolor="#FFFFFF"
| 
| 13.10 (88)
| 
| 16.9 (105)
| Arden Street Oval
| 12,000
| 9 July 1955

Round 13

|- bgcolor="#CCCCFF"
| Home team
| Home team score
| Away team
| Away team score
| Venue
| Crowd
| Date
|- bgcolor="#FFFFFF"
| 
| 10.11 (71)
| 
| 6.16 (52)
| Kardinia Park
| 26,755
| 16 July 1955
|- bgcolor="#FFFFFF"
| 
| 14.16 (100)
| 
| 6.10 (46)
| Brunswick Street Oval
| 12,500
| 16 July 1955
|- bgcolor="#FFFFFF"
| 
| 15.9 (99)
| 
| 13.14 (92)
| Victoria Park
| 16,813
| 16 July 1955
|- bgcolor="#FFFFFF"
| 
| 10.19 (79)
| 
| 9.9 (63)
| Princes Park
| 15,763
| 16 July 1955
|- bgcolor="#FFFFFF"
| 
| 8.9 (57)
| 
| 6.12 (48)
| Punt Road Oval
| 17,500
| 16 July 1955
|- bgcolor="#FFFFFF"
| 
| 5.7 (37)
| 
| 10.22 (82)
| Junction Oval
| 12,250
| 16 July 1955

Round 14

|- bgcolor="#CCCCFF"
| Home team
| Home team score
| Away team
| Away team score
| Venue
| Crowd
| Date
|- bgcolor="#FFFFFF"
| 
| 10.11 (71)
| 
| 6.15 (51)
| Glenferrie Oval
| 12,100
| 23 July 1955
|- bgcolor="#FFFFFF"
| 
| 11.8 (74)
| 
| 9.19 (73)
| Western Oval
| 32,735
| 23 July 1955
|- bgcolor="#FFFFFF"
| 
| 14.16 (100)
| 
| 14.13 (97)
| Punt Road Oval
| 25,000
| 23 July 1955
|- bgcolor="#FFFFFF"
| 
| 9.7 (61)
| 
| 17.23 (125)
| Arden Street Oval
| 18,000
| 23 July 1955
|- bgcolor="#FFFFFF"
| 
| 10.11 (71)
| 
| 16.20 (116)
| Junction Oval
| 18,500
| 23 July 1955
|- bgcolor="#FFFFFF"
| 
| 11.14 (80)
| 
| 13.16 (94)
| Brunswick Street Oval
| 19,500
| 23 July 1955

Round 15

|- bgcolor="#CCCCFF"
| Home team
| Home team score
| Away team
| Away team score
| Venue
| Crowd
| Date
|- bgcolor="#FFFFFF"
| 
| 12.18 (90)
| 
| 8.15 (63)
| MCG
| 15,486
| 30 July 1955
|- bgcolor="#FFFFFF"
| 
| 9.18 (72)
| 
| 5.22 (52)
| Windy Hill
| 32,000
| 30 July 1955
|- bgcolor="#FFFFFF"
| 
| 10.11 (71)
| 
| 5.6 (36)
| Victoria Park
| 16,000
| 30 July 1955
|- bgcolor="#FFFFFF"
| 
| 11.21 (87)
| 
| 3.13 (31)
| Princes Park
| 9,742
| 30 July 1955
|- bgcolor="#FFFFFF"
| 
| 14.9 (93)
| 
| 13.16 (94)
| Lake Oval
| 16,000
| 30 July 1955
|- bgcolor="#FFFFFF"
| 
| 12.14 (86)
| 
| 9.11 (65)
| Kardinia Park
| 14,033
| 30 July 1955

Round 16

|- bgcolor="#CCCCFF"
| Home team
| Home team score
| Away team
| Away team score
| Venue
| Crowd
| Date
|- bgcolor="#FFFFFF"
| 
| 8.5 (53)
| 
| 11.16 (82)
| Junction Oval
| 10,150
| 6 August 1955
|- bgcolor="#FFFFFF"
| 
| 10.13 (73)
| 
| 10.16 (76)
| Western Oval
| 33,902
| 6 August 1955
|- bgcolor="#FFFFFF"
| 
| 6.17 (53)
| 
| 11.9 (75)
| Brunswick Street Oval
| 14,000
| 6 August 1955
|- bgcolor="#FFFFFF"
| 
| 8.12 (60)
| 
| 8.5 (53)
| Arden Street Oval
| 9,000
| 6 August 1955
|- bgcolor="#FFFFFF"
| 
| 16.23 (119)
| 
| 7.12 (54)
| MCG
| 49,352
| 6 August 1955
|- bgcolor="#FFFFFF"
| 
| 12.17 (89)
| 
| 7.10 (52)
| Victoria Park
| 28,000
| 6 August 1955

Round 17

|- bgcolor="#CCCCFF"
| Home team
| Home team score
| Away team
| Away team score
| Venue
| Crowd
| Date
|- bgcolor="#FFFFFF"
| 
| 12.13 (85)
| 
| 13.13 (91)
| Glenferrie Oval
| 16,000
| 13 August 1955
|- bgcolor="#FFFFFF"
| 
| 19.17 (131)
| 
| 7.10 (52)
| Kardinia Park
| 13,444
| 13 August 1955
|- bgcolor="#FFFFFF"
| 
| 9.7 (61)
| 
| 11.13 (79)
| Brunswick Street Oval
| 20,000
| 13 August 1955
|- bgcolor="#FFFFFF"
| 
| 12.20 (92)
| 
| 10.9 (69)
| Punt Road Oval
| 14,500
| 13 August 1955
|- bgcolor="#FFFFFF"
| 
| 19.19 (133)
| 
| 8.12 (60)
| Windy Hill
| 34,000
| 13 August 1955
|- bgcolor="#FFFFFF"
| 
| 6.12 (48)
| 
| 12.7 (79)
| Lake Oval
| 18,000
| 13 August 1955

Round 18

|- bgcolor="#CCCCFF"
| Home team
| Home team score
| Away team
| Away team score
| Venue
| Crowd
| Date
|- bgcolor="#FFFFFF"
| 
| 12.22 (94)
| 
| 4.7 (31)
| MCG
| 19,484
| 20 August 1955
|- bgcolor="#FFFFFF"
| 
| 7.17 (59)
| 
| 7.7 (49)
| Victoria Park
| 19,270
| 20 August 1955
|- bgcolor="#FFFFFF"
| 
| 10.6 (66)
| 
| 8.12 (60)
| Princes Park
| 22,482
| 20 August 1955
|- bgcolor="#FFFFFF"
| 
| 6.7 (43)
| 
| 19.23 (137)
| Junction Oval
| 13,000
| 20 August 1955
|- bgcolor="#FFFFFF"
| 
| 5.5 (35)
| 
| 14.11 (95)
| Arden Street Oval
| 20,000
| 20 August 1955
|- bgcolor="#FFFFFF"
| 
| 7.8 (50)
| 
| 13.14 (92)
| Glenferrie Oval
| 24,500
| 20 August 1955

Ladder

Finals

First Semi-Final

Second Semi-Final

Preliminary Final

Grand final

Awards
The 1955 VFL Premiership team was Melbourne.
The VFL's leading goalkicker was Noel Rayson of Geelong with 80 goals (including 3 goals in the final series). 
The winner of the 1955 Brownlow Medal was Fred Goldsmith of South Melbourne with 21 votes.
St. Kilda took the "wooden spoon" in 1955.

Notable events
The 15-yard penalty (precursor to the modern 50-metre penalty) was introduced to the rules nationally by the Australian National Football Council, allowing the umpire to advance the spot of a mark or free kick by 15 yards in the event of crude, late challenges on the player with the mark.
The highest aggregate score in a match for the year was only 207 points, which is the lowest for any VFL/AFL season since 1922. There was no match in which both teams scored more than 100 points.
St Kilda's average score of 47.8 per match was the lowest average by any team since 1919.
Towards the end of the Round 4 match between Fitzroy and Geelong at the Brunswick Street Oval Fitzroy full-forward Tony Ongarello was so upset with his own inaccurate kicking that, upon taking a mark, he indicated to the field umpire that he was going to kick a place-kick. He scored a goal. He was so impressed that he kicked one more goal in that match with a place kick. He kicked several goals later in the season from place kicks as well, but ultimately had little more success with place kicks than he had with punts. Although it has never been (and is still not) against the rules to do so, he is on record as the last player ever to score a goal with a place kick in a senior VFL match. Ongarello was not the first player to attempt to revive the place kick in 1955:  full forward Colin Vance had unsuccessfully attempted a place kick for goal on debut three weeks earlier.
After North Melbourne's humiliating Round 11 loss to St Kilda – who had not won a match since Round 16 1954 and were now captain-coached by former North Melbourne star Les Foote – the North Melbourne committee suspended two of its senior players (Mick Grambeau and Laurie Icke) indefinitely from both playing and training with the club for "not having tried hard enough" in the match.
Defending Premiers Footscray missed out on a place in the Final Four by just 0.6%.
In the dying minutes of the Grand Final, Melbourne's 19th man Frank "Bluey" Adams rushed from the bench to take his place on the field and collided with the (unsighted by Adams) Collingwood winger Des Healey who, up to that stage, had been one of the best on the ground. Both participants in this horrific head clash were carried off unconscious. Healey had his nose broken in five places, a fractured skull, and never played for Collingwood again. "Bluey" Adams 15-second playing time is the shortest in VFL history.(Ross, 1996, p. 202).

See also
 List of VFL debuts in 1955

Sources
Rogers, S. & Brown, A., Every Game Ever Played: VFL/AFL Results 1897–1997 (Sixth Edition), Viking Books, (Ringwood), 1998. 
Ross, J. (ed), 100 Years of Australian Football 1897–1996: The Complete Story of the AFL, All the Big Stories, All the Great Pictures, All the Champions, Every AFL Season Reported, Viking, (Ringwood), 1996.

References

External links
1955 Season - AFL Tables
Geoff McClure, "The place kick 50 years dead", the Age, 16 June 2005

Australian Football League seasons
Vfl season